In Full Swing is the fourth studio album by American actor and singer Seth MacFarlane. It was released on September 15, 2017, through Republic Records and Verve Records. The record was primarily produced by Joel McNeely and MacFarlane himself, who also serves as the executive producer. Featured artists included on the album are American singer-songwriter Norah Jones and American actress and singer Elizabeth Gillies.

The album received two nominations at the 60th Annual Grammy Awards for Best Traditional Pop Vocal Album and Best Arrangement, Instrumental and Vocals.

Background
On May 23, 2016, MacFarlane announced on his Twitter account that he was recording songs for his new album. On May 28, 2016, he revealed that the songs on the album were arranged by Joel McNeely, whom he had worked with on the previous three albums. On May 30, 2016, MacFarlane revealed that it was his final day of recording at Abbey Road Studios and thanked all the musicians who collaborated with him on the album. On August 17, 2017, the album was officially announced and was set to be released a month later.

Singles
The album's first lead single, "That Face", was released on August 17, 2017. The album's second single, "Almost Like Being in Love", was released on August 28, 2017. The album's third and final single, "Have You Met Miss Jones?", was released on September 7, 2017.

Critical reception

In Full Swing received mostly positive reviews from music critics. AllMusic's Stephen Thomas Erlewine wrote: "Standing in contrast to the moody 2015 set No One Ever Tells You, 2017's In Full Swing contains some of the sunny brio its title suggests. Chalk it up to the songs Seth MacFarlane selects, of course. There's nary a song of heartbreak among the album's 16 numbers, and he doesn't rely on overly familiar tunes, either. This lighthearted batch of songs is given effervescent arrangements by Joel McNeely, who gladly keeps the proceedings cool and breezy. As always, MacFarlane and McNeely are so besotted with Frank Sinatra's classic long-players for Capitol that their act can seem like a bit of swinging cosplay, with MacFarlane mimicking Old Blue Eyes' finger-snapping charm and McNeely penning love letters to Nelson Riddle, but their execution is expert and, since the touch is light, In Full Swing feels looser and better than its predecessors. MacFarlane and McNeely have taken Frank's advice to take things Nice 'n' Easy to heart, and they're the better for it." Christopher Louden from JazzTimes praised the album, writing, "MacFarlane proves (yet again) fully worthy of such bounty. Alongside top-tier standards from the Gershwins, Irving Berlin, Jerome Kern, Rodgers and Hart, Lerner and Loewe and Jimmy Van Heusen, he unearths several less precious though no less glittering baubles. Among them: the overjoyed "I Like Myself", from It's Always Fair Weather; the jaunty Gordon MacRae-Gisele McKenzie number "My Buick, My Love and I" (featuring Elizabeth Gillies); the pert "A Kiss or Two"; and a sparkling parry with Norah Jones on "If I Had a Talking Picture of You". Through it all, you can't help but be carried away by MacFarlane’s joie de vivre, like a kid in a candy store gleefully sharing his sugar-dusted treats."

Track listing

Personnel 
Credits adapted from AllMusic.

 Jonathan Aasgaard – cello
 Richard Altenbach – violin
 John Anderson – oboe
 Timothy Ball – horn
 Lianne Barnard – flute
 John Barrett – engineering assistance
 Francesca Barritt – violin
 Annie Beilby – viola
 Wayne Bergeron – trumpet
 Chuck Berghofer – bass, rhythm bass
 Alan Bergman – composition
 Irving Berlin – composition
 Rich Breen – engineering, mixing
 Alan Broadbent – keyboards
 Jack Brooks – composition
 Robert Brophy – viola
 Johnny Burke – composition
 Sammy Cahn – composition
 Rowena Calvert – cello
 Gordon Campbell – trombone
 Roberto Cani – violin
 Corinne Chapelle – violin
 Pete Christlieb – saxophone
 Stephano Civetta – engineering assistance
 Heather Clark – flute
 Dave Collins – mastering
 Betty Comden – composition
 Tom Croxon – orchestra contractor
 Wade Culbreath – percussion
 Hannah Dawson – violin
 Autumn de Wilde – cover photo
 Brian Dembow – viola
 Buddy DeSylva – composition
 Shlomy Dobrinsky – violin
 Jimmy Dorsey – composition
 Pierre Doumenge – cello
 Bruce Dukov – violin
 Pip Eastop – horn
 Stephen Erdody – cello
 Peter Erskine – drums
 Alan Estes – percussion
 Dave Everson – horn
 Joy Fehily – executive production
 Dorothy Fields – composition
 Chuck Findley – trumpet
 Marlow Fisher – viola
 Matthew Funes – viola
 Lorenz Gamma – violin
 George Gershwin – composition
 Ira Gershwin – composition
 Elizabeth Gillies – vocals
 Mark Graham – music preparation
 Peter Graham – violin
 Endre Granat – violin
 Adolph Green – composition
 Clifford Grey – composition
 Henry Gronnier – violin
 Lorenz Hart – composition
 Andrew Harvey – violin
 Clayton Haslop – violin
 Tamara Hatwan – violin
 Ray Henderson – composition
 James Van Heusen – composition
 Dan Higgins – alto saxophone, saxophone, woodwind
 Steven Holtman – trombone
 Greg Huckins – saxophone
 Alex Iles – trombone
 Jeremy Isaac – violin
 Kurt Iswarienko – photography
 Charis Jenson – violin
 Karen Jones – flute
 Norah Jones – vocals
 Dennis Karmazyn – viola
 Daniel Kelly – horn
 Jerome Kern – composition
 Liam Kirkman – trombone
 Larry Koonse – guitar
 Aimee Kreston – violin
 Armen Ksajikian – cello
 Stephen Kujala – flute
 Dunja Lavrova – violin
 Alan Jay Lerner – composition
 Phillip Levy – violin
 Gary Lindsay – vocal consultant
 Bill Liston – saxophone
 Frederick Loewe – composition
 Mike Lovatt – trumpet
 Warren Luening – trumpet
 James Lynch – trumpet
 Jens Lynen – violin
 Seth MacFarlane – vocals, production
 Paul Madeira – composition
 Danny Marsden – trumpet
 Andrew Martin – trombone
 Ciaran McCabe – violin
 Joel McNeely – arrangement, conducting, production
 John Mills – violin
 Victoria Miskolczy – viola
 Catherine Musker – viola
 Benjamin Newton – viola
 Helen Nightengale – violin
 Peter Noah – bass trombone
 Cheryl Norman – violin
 Michael Nowak – viola
 Brian O'Connor – horn
 Sid Page – violin
 Andy Panayi – alto saxophone
 Joel Pargman – violin
 Alyssa Park – violin
 John Parricelli – guitar
 André Previn – composition
 Tom Ranier – celeste, piano
 Joe Raposo – composition
 Bill Reichenbach – trombone
 Mark Robertson – violin
 Leo Robin – composition
 Richard Rodgers – composition
 Ruth Rogers – violin
 Benedict Rogerson – cello
 Anatoly Rosinsky – violin
 Geraldine Rotella – flute
 Roberto Ruisi – violin
 Brian Scanlon – saxophone
 Colin Skinner – baritone saxophone
 Frank Skinner – composition
 David H. Speltz – viola
 Lew Spence – composition
 Joe Spix – art direction
 Jonathan Stokes – trombone
 Jule Styne – composition
 Bob Summers – trumpet
 Jamie Talbot – tenor saxophone
 James Thatcher – horn
 Phil Todd – tenor saxophone
 Cecilia Tsan – viola
 Viktoriya Tsoy – design
 Jo Ann Turovsky – harp
 Josefina Vergara – violin
 Dave Walther – viola
 Sam Walton – percussion, timpani
 Vicci Wardman – viola
 Hugh Webb – harp
 David Weiss – oboe
 Patrick White – trumpet
 Roger Wilkie – violin
 Steven Wilkie – violin
 Andy Wood – trombone
 Vincent Youmans – composition

Charts
In Full Swing debuted at No. 2 on the US Billboard Top Jazz Albums.

Release history

References

External links

 

2017 albums
Albums produced by Joel McNeely
Big band albums
Covers albums
Republic Records albums
Seth MacFarlane albums
Swing albums
Verve Records albums